The 1977 London summit was the 4th NATO summit bringing the leaders of member nations together at the same time. The formal sessions and informal meetings in London took place on 10–11 May 1977. This event was only the fifth meeting of the NATO heads of state following the ceremonial signing of the North Atlantic Treaty on 4 April 1949.

Background
In this period, the organization faced unresolved questions concerned whether a new generation of leaders would be as committed to NATO as their predecessors had been.

See also
 EU summit
 G8 summit

Notes

References
 Thomas, Ian Q.R. (1997). The promise of alliance: NATO and the political imagination. Lanham: Rowman & Littlefield. ;

External links
 NATO update, 1977

1977 in politics
1977 London summit
Summit of 1977
1977 in the United Kingdom
Diplomatic conferences in the United Kingdom
20th-century diplomatic conferences
1977 conferences
1977 in international relations
United Kingdom and NATO
1977 in British politics
Conferences in London
May 1977 events in the United Kingdom